George Lewis (1875–unknown) was an English footballer who played in the Football League for Bristol City, Leicester Fosse, Notts County and Walsall.

References

1875 births
date of death unknown
English footballers
Association football defenders
English Football League players
Walsall F.C. players
Wellingborough Town F.C. players
Notts County F.C. players
Bristol City F.C. players
Stourbridge F.C. players
Leicester City F.C. players